Ernst Klusen (20 February 1909 in Düsseldorf – 31 July 1988 in Bad Segeberg) was a German musicologist, educator and Volkslied composer.

Work

Books and songbooks 
 Das Volkslied im niederrheinischen Dorf. Studien zum Volksliedschatz der Gemeinde Hinsbeck mit besonderer Berücksichtigung der Melodien. Voggenreiter Verlag, Potsdam 1941.
 Der Stammescharakter in den Weisen neuerer deutscher Volkslieder. Voggenreiter, Bad Godesberg 1953.
 Die Windmühle. Niederrheinische Volkslieder. Voggenreiter, Bad Godesberg 1955.
 Sankt Martin. Lieder und Lampen. Voggenreiter, Bad Godesberg 1955.
 Das Bonner Gesangbuch von 1550. Edited by Ernst Klusen. Staufen-Verlag, Kamp-Lintfort 1965.
 Volkslied. Fund und Erfindung. Gerig, Cologne 1969.
 Das Volkslied im niederrheinischen Dorf. Studien zum Lebensbereich des Volksliedes der Gemeinde Hinsbeck im Wandel einer Generation. Voggenreiter, Bonn-Bad Godesberg 1970.
 Bevorzugte Liedtypen Zehn- bis Vierzehnjähriger. Gerig, Cologne 1971.
 Gefahr und Elend einer neuen Musikdidaktik. Gerig, Cologne 1973.
 Zur Situation des Singens in der Bundesrepublik Deutschland. Part 1: Der Umgang mit dem Lied (Mitarbeit: V. Karbusický). Gerig, Cologne 1974.
 Zur Situation des Singens in der Bundesrepublik Deutschland. Part 2: Die Lieder (Mitarbeit: V. Karbusický). Gerig, Cologne 1975, .
 Johann Wilhelm Wilms. Leben und Werk. Knuf, Buren 1975.
 Kritische Lieder der 70er Jahre. Fischer, Frankfurt/M 1978, .
 Volkslieder aus 500 Jahren. Fischer, Frankfurt 1978, .
 Das Musikleben der Stadt Krefeld 1780–1945. A. Volk, Cologne 1979/80.
 Deutsche Lieder. Texte und Melodien. Insel, Frankfurt/M 1980, .
 Gevaren van de nieuwere muziekdidaktiek. Muusses, Purmerend 1980, .
 Elektronische Medien und musikalische Laienaktivität. Gerig, Cologne 1980, .
 Die schönsten Kinderlieder und Kinderreime. Naumann and Göbel, Cologne 1987, .
 Singen. Materialien zu einer Theorie. Bosse. Regensburg 1989, .

Compositions 
 Dialect song arrangements for choir: Et Paterke, Het Quieselche, Wenn’t Kirmes is
 3 String quartets
 Double Concerto for cello, bassoon and orchestra
 Oratorio for solos, choir and large orchestra
 Triludium II for guitar, violoncello and flute

Bibliography 
 Rudolf Adrians: Ernst Klusen (Heimatverein Viersen. Jahreskarte.). Heimatverein Viersen, Viersen 1999 (online, PDF; 87261,32 KB).
 Karl-Hans Bonzelett, Werner Tillmann: Ernst Klusen 1909–1988. Das Volkslied als Lebensauftrag. In Heimatbuch des Kreises Viersen. Vol. 60, 2009 (2008),  (inline, PDF; 131,68 KB).
 Günther Noll: Ernst Klusen – 70 Jahre. In Ad marginem. Randbemerkungen zur europäischen Musikethnologie. Nr. 42, 1979,  (online, PDF; 81,84 KB).
 Günther Noll, Marianne Bröcker (editors): Musikalische Volkskunde – aktuell. Festschrift für Ernst Klusen zum 75. Geburtstag. Wegener, Bonn 1984, .
 Wilhelm Schepping: Nachruf Ernst Klusen (1909–1988). In Jahrbuch für Volksliedforschung. Jg. 34, 1989, .
 Wolfgang Schmidt: Dr. Ernst Klusen verstorben. In Der Niederrhein. Nr. 4/1988. Krefeld 1988, .
 Wilhelm Schepping: Volkslied als Auftrag. Leben und Werk Ernst Klusens. In: Günther Noll, Wilhelm Schepping (Hrsg.): Musikalische Volkskultur in der Stadt der Gegenwart. Tagungsbericht Köln 1988 der Kommission für Lied-, Musik- und Tanzforschung in der Deutschen Gesellschaft für Volkskunde e.V. Metzler, Hannover 1992, .

References

External links 
 
 Ich wollte Volkslieder schreiben : Gespräche mit Ernst Klusen on WorldCat
 Ernst Klusen on GoodReads

1909 births
1988 deaths
Writers from Düsseldorf
20th-century German musicologists
German music educators
German folk-song collectors
Members of the Royal Netherlands Academy of Arts and Sciences
20th-century German composers